The 1901 Yale Bulldogs football team was an American football team that represented Yale University as an independent during the 1901 college football season. In its first season under head coach George S. Stillman, the team compiled an 11–1–1 record and outscored opponents by a total of 251 to 37.

A modern authority on college football rankings said,"When Harvard met Yale at season's end, it was considered to be for the national championship, and if there had been an AP poll in 1901, Yale might well have finished #2. That is because they were considered to be the top program in college football." Years later, Harvard was retrospectively selected as the national champion by Parke H. Davis, a fact in conflict with an NCAA publication, which mentions Yale.

Center Henry Holt was selected by Walter Camp as the first team center on the 1901 All-America team. Other notable players on the 1901 Yale team included halfback George B. Chadwick, quarterback John de Saulles, end Joseph R. Swan, tackle James Hogan, and guard Herman Olcott.

Schedule

References

Yale
Yale Bulldogs football seasons
College football national champions
Yale Bulldogs football